Keith Rapp (also known as W. Keith Rapp) (1934-2022) was an Oklahoma attorney who served as judge on the Oklahoma Court of Civil Appeals, the intermediate appellate court in the state of Oklahoma, from 1984 to 2022. A native of Ohio, he earned his law degree from the University of Tulsa School of Law.

Biography
Judge Rapp was born on May 2, 1934 in Wheelersburg, Ohio. He received his undergraduate degree from Southwest Missouri State University (now Missouri State University) and took graduate classes in mathematics and statistics from the University of Missouri, University of Minnesota and University of Arizona. Rapp then worked as an aerospace engineer on many major NASA projects before receiving his J.D. degree from the University of Tulsa. Rapp later earned a Master of Laws degree from the University of Virginia.

Military service and aerospace career
From 1953 to 1955, he served in the US Navy, completing two tours of duty in the Far East as an aerial navigator and electronics warfare operator with the VC-35. Later, he retired from the U.S. Naval Reserves as a Judge Advocate General Corps commander.

Returning to civilian life, Rapp went to work as an aerospace engineer, specializing in inertial guidance and navigation systems. Some of his projects included Mercury, Gemini, Apollo, and SkyLab for the U.S. space program and Bomarc, the first operational surface-to-air missile for the Department of Defense. While working as an engineer, he enrolled in the University of Tulsa School of Law, where he earned his Juris Doctor (J.D.) degree. Later, he earned the LLM degree from the University of Virginia.

Legal career
After completing law school at the University of Tulsa, Judge Rapp served as a public defender and city prosecutor in Broken Arrow, Oklahoma.  He later served as a municipal judge in Bixby, Oklahoma and then an alternative municipal judge in Tulsa, Oklahoma.  After this, he was judge on the 14th District Court in Tulsa. He stood for election against incumbent Judge Fred DeMier for the Oklahoma Court of Civil Appeals in 1984. It was the first time a challenger had unseated an incumbent since the Oklahoma Court of Civil Appeals was created in 1969.

Voters chose to retain Rapp on the Appeals Court most recently in the 2014 election. His retention rating was 59.3 percent.

Death
Rapp died on August 16, 2022, at the age of 88.

Personal
He married the former Mary Lynn Clanton. They have three children, Elizabeth, Kathy and Joseph.

Notes

External links
 Oklahoma Court of Civil Appeals website
 Tulsa World: Court of Appeals Judges on 2008 Ballot

References

1934 births
People from Wheelersburg, Ohio
Living people
Public defenders
Missouri State University alumni
University of Tulsa alumni
University of Virginia School of Law alumni
University of Missouri alumni
Aerospace engineers